Ericameria zionis, the subalpine goldenbush or cedar breaks goldenbush, is a rare North American species of flowering plants in the family Asteraceae. It has been found only at high elevations in the mountains in the southern part of the state of Utah in the western United States. Some of the populations lie inside Cedar Breaks National Monument and Bryce Canyon National Park.

Ericameria zionis is a branching shrub up to 30 cm (12 inches) tall. Leaves are spatula-shaped, up to 40 mm (1.6 inches) long. One plant can produce many small white flower heads in a tightly packed clump, each head with as many as 21 disc florets but no ray florets.

References

External links
Photo of herbarium specimen at Missouri Botanical Garden, collected in Utah in 1980, isotype of Haplopappus zionis/Ericameria zionis 

zionis
Flora of Utah
Flora of the Colorado Plateau and Canyonlands region
Endemic flora of the United States
Cedar Breaks National Monument
Bryce Canyon National Park
Zion National Park
Plants described in 1983
Flora without expected TNC conservation status